Matthew Garwood is an Australian operatic and musical theatre singer from Launceston, Tasmania. After being a finalist on The Voice in 2014 he issued his debut album, The Tattooed Tenor (November 2014), which peaked at No. 47 on the ARIA Albums Chart.

Biography 

Garwood is an operatic tenor with a background in musical theatre. He performed the role of Raoul in the Phantom of the Opera at the Encore Theatre in Launceston, in March 2014. He appeared on the 2014 season of The Voice from May to June. After being eliminated, Garwood signed with Decca Australia and released his debut album, The Tattooed Tenor (November 2014), which peaked at No. 47 on the ARIA Albums Chart. He had the title role in The Buddy Holly Story in 2016. From June to July 2018 he played Anthony in The Playhouse Theatre production of Sweeney Todd in Hobart.

Discography

Studio albums

References

Living people
People from Tasmania
21st-century Australian singers
21st-century Australian male singers
Year of birth missing (living people)